Circle the wagons is an English language idiom which may refer to a group of people who unite for a common purpose. Historically the term was used to describe a defensive maneuver which was employed by the Americans in 19th century. The term has evolved colloquially to mean people defending each other.

Etymology

In America during the mid 1800s many pioneers traveled west by wagon.  Typically these were Conestoga wagons and they traveled west in a single file line known as a wagon train. At night the wagons would form a circle around their encampment and livestock for defensive reasons.

"Circling the wagon" is still an idiomatic expression for a person or group preparing to defend themselves against attack or criticism.

English language uses
In contemporary English the phrase Circle the wagons is often used figuratively and idiomatically to describe members of a group protecting each other, for instance when political parties and groups defend their own views and chastise those outside of their group.

Cultural insensitivity
The term frequently describes rival factions banding together to support one another. Some indigenous people view the term as offensive based on its literal meaning stemming from the manifest destiny era. Critics have said the term is culturally insensitive and evokes racist images of Native Americans.

See also
 Adage
 Comprehension of Idioms
 Idiom in English language
 Morphology (linguistics)

References

Idioms
Adages
Colloquial terms
Category
English-language idioms